Canal 9 is the second television station established in Costa Rica, having begun broadcasts in 1961 as Tic Tac Canal 9.

In 1993, the channel was acquired by Remigio Ángel González becoming the first station owned by the then-new Repretel group. It later sub-leased to TV Azteca and was sold in 2000. Repretel moved channel 9's programming to the newly acquired Repretel Channel 4, bought from TV Azteca in the same year. Afterwards, channel 9 was branded as Spectamérica.

From 2011 to 2015, the station was branded as canal nueve, and still carried TV Azteca programming as well as local shows. In September 2015, the local shows were cancelled as the channel was forced to quit 120 employees. There were speculations of a reacquisition of the channel by Repretel, but these were not true.

References

Television stations in Costa Rica
Television channels and stations established in 1994
Television channels and stations disestablished in 2000